is a public park in Hitachinaka, Ibaraki, Japan.

Overview
Covering an area of 190 hectares, the park features blooming flowers around the year. The park has become known for its baby blue-eyes flowers, with the blooming of 4.5 million of the translucent-petaled blue flowers in the spring drawing tourists. In addition to the annual "Nemophila Harmony", the park features a million daffodils, 170 varieties of tulips, and many other flowers. The park includes cycling trails and a small amusement park with a Ferris wheel.

Events

Hitachi Seaside Park hosts the Rock in Japan Festival in August every year.

Access
The nearest railway station is Ajigaura Station on the Minato Line of the Hitachinaka Seaside Railway (via Katsuta Station on the JR Joban Line).

References

External links

 

National Government Parks of Japan
Parks and gardens in Ibaraki Prefecture
Hitachinaka, Ibaraki